Benjamin Chang Calhoun (born 1979) is an American radio journalist and a producer for the public radio program This American Life and the podcast Serial.  Originally from Milwaukee, Wisconsin, he now lives in New Jersey. Calhoun left This American Life from 2014 to 2017 to serve as Vice President of Content and Programming at WBEZ, the NPR affiliate in Chicago. Prior to that, Calhoun produced and reported for This American Life. Calhoun has taught at Loyola University Chicago and lectured at other universities. Prior to his work on  This American Life, he spent eight years as a reporter and deputy news director at WBEZ, where he covered politics and did documentary work. His work has also aired on Morning Edition, All Things Considered, Day to Day, Marketplace, and WNYC's The Takeaway and Radiolab.

Early life and education 
Born in Milwaukee, Calhoun earned a bachelor's degree in English in 2001 from Oberlin College in Oberlin, Ohio, where he was the station manager for WOBC-FM, the student-operated station on campus.

Professional career 
Calhoun began his journalism career when he joined Chicago Public Radio as an unpaid intern during the summer of 2000. He was later hired full time, and was promoted from newsroom coordinator to deputy news director in 2003.

From 2004 until 2008, Calhoun helped direct election coverage for Chicago Public Radio. He appeared on episodes of the Week in Review on WTTW-TV's Chicago Tonight program, where he provided commentary on current political news.

In 2005, Calhoun was awarded a grant by the Illinois Humanities Council that allowed him to pursue his interests in documentary work. Additional support was provided by Chicago Public Radio, where he used the grant to direct, edit, and curate an exhibition of audio and photo documentary work entitled The Daily Meaning: Life Inside America's Service Industries that went on display at the Peace Museum on September 2, 2005. In 2006, the documentary was nominated for the Helen and Martin Schwarz Prize by the Illinois Humanities Council. Calhoun served as the executive producer for the documentary A New Generation of Veterans, which was awarded second place for "Beat Radio Documentary or Series" by the Illinois Associated Press.

In February 2006, Calhoun was named WBEZ-FM/Chicago Public Radio's political reporter.

Calhoun resigned from Chicago Public Radio in February 2009 to move to New York. He is currently working as a producer for the radio program This American Life.

Personal 
Calhoun is married to The New York Times journalist Catrin Einhorn. Calhoun is half-Chinese through his mother.

References

1979 births
Living people
American journalists of Chinese descent
American radio journalists
Oberlin College alumni
Radio personalities from Chicago
Radio personalities from Milwaukee